Rosa González is the name of:

Rosa A. González, Puerta Rican nurse
Rosa González Román, Chilean politicians
Rosa Torre González, Mexican politician